Buria is a small town and earlier was a municipal committee now the part of Yamunanagr Nagar nigam  situated on the banks of the Western Yamuna Canal approximately  from the city of Jagadhri and 8 km from Jagadhri railway station.

History
Buri Fort, there is a fort in Buria, with Rang Mahal (pleasure palace) used by Hamayun when he came here for hunting in Shivalik forests, whereas some relate this Rang Mahal to Birbal, court advisor to the Mughal emperor Akbar. The presence of Birbal Dwar (Birbal Gate) in the village indicates relation to Birbal.

During the British Raj, Buria was captured by the Sikhs in 1760, and  became the headquarters of a Jat principality, which before the Treaty of Amritsar (1809) between the British and Maharaja Ranjit singh had been divided into two chiefships of Buria and Dialgarh. Contention between the widows of the last male holder of Dialgarh led to its subdivision into the estates of Jagadhri and Dialgarh which after few years came under British protection. Jagadhri jagir lapsed in 1829 and came under direct British control. The Rani of Dialgarh was one of the nine chiefs who were retained as independent protected chiefs. She retained her position until her death in 1852, after which jagir of Dialgarh also lapsed and it came under direct British rule. Buria proper was also reduced to the status of an ordinary jagir in 1849.

Other attractions include the medieval "Pataleshwar Mahadev Shiv Mandir", the "Sanatan Dharam Hanuman Mandir" and a Gurudwara (Sikh temple) in remembrance of the ninth Sikh Guru Tegh Bahadur.

Buria CCS HAU Regional Research Station

This research station is meant for the Horticultural Research in the region. Presently the work is based on the germplasms of mango, litchi, pear, peach plum, sapota, guava, apple and lemon. The research station is equipped with one weather observatory which provide daily weather data for the research purposes. Also the inter-cropping experiments were going on based on the newly planted orchard where the space available is utilized to develop technology for increasing the profits at the farmer's end.

Demographics
 India census, Buria had a population of 9829. Males constitute 55% of the population and females 45%. Buria has an average literacy rate of 58%, lower than the national average of 59.5%; with male literacy of 65% and female literacy of 50%. 14% of the population is under six years of age. Now Buria has a good education facility two private and one Govt sen Sec School along with one primary school.

See also 
 Adi Badri
 Amadalpur
 Chhachhrauli
 Chaneti Buddhist Stupa
 Kapal Mochan
 Sugh Ancient Mound

References

Cities and towns in Yamunanagar district